Nirim (lit. Meadows) is a kibbutz in the northwestern Negev in Israel. Located near the border with the Gaza Strip, about 7 kilometers east of Khan Yunis, it falls under the jurisdiction of Eshkol Regional Council.

History
The kibbutz was established in June 1946 as part of the 11 points in the Negev plan aimed at establishing a Jewish presence in the Negev in order to claim it as part of a future Jewish state. It was named after the Nir brigade of the Hashomer Hatzair youth movement, some of whose members helped establish the kibbutz, and was originally established on a site called "Dangour", where kibbutz Sufa is now. One of the founders was Dan Zur, who became one of Israel's leading landscape architects.

At the outbreak of the 1948 Arab–Israeli War on 15 May 1948, the kibbutz was first Jewish settlement in Israel to be attacked by the Egyptian army, in the Battle of Nirim. It had 39 defenders. During the battle, the Egyptians came within 25 meters of the kibbutz perimeter and eight of the kibbutz defenders were killed, before Egyptians withdrew. All of the houses were destroyed in the attack.

Nirim remained an Israel Defense Forces (IDF) outpost against the Egyptian army throughout the war. After the war, the IDF wanted the site because of its strategic location, while the kibbutzniks wanted to move north, to the line of 200 millimeters of rain a year, so the kibbutz moved some 15 kilometers northeast to its present location, next to the site of an ancient synagogue at Horvat Maon. 

During the Mapam split of 1952, Moshe Sneh's supporters were banished from the kibbutz. Until 1956, it was targeted by Fedayeen attacks from the Gaza Strip.

Since 2000, Nirim has been hit by Qassam rockets fired from the Gaza Strip.  After Israel's launching of Operation Cast Lead, in January 2009, most of Nirim's members, as well as other villages near the Gaza Strip, were evacuated. Dozens of families from Nirim stayed at kibbutz Mishmar HaEmek in the Jezreel Valley for a month, until the end of the operation. On August 26, 2014, on the last day of Operation Protective Edge, the head of security, Ze'ev "Ze'evik" Etzion and the assistant head of security Shachar Melamed, were killed in a rocket attack. They were both working with a team of electricians and other kibbutz members, attempting to reinstate the electricity to the community after the high voltage tower that supplied electricity to the whole kibbutz was hit by a rocket earlier the same day. The same rocket attack that killed Ze'evik and Shachar, blew off the legs of Gadi Yarkoni, who has since been elected mayor of the Eshkol Regional Council, and currently serving his second term.

Economy
Nirim produces organically grown peanuts, sweet potatoes, turnips, carrots, wheat, barley, avocado and  other vegetables, and exports them to Europe. The farmers work the land right up to the Gaza Strip barrier. After Israel's disengagement from Gaza in 2005, the Defense Ministry decided to construct a security strip in the area surrounding Gaza, which was to run through Nirim agricultural territory. Nirim was asked to concede NIS 1 million of its compensation funds.

References

External links

Official website

Kibbutzim
Kibbutz Movement
Populated places established in 1946
Gaza envelope
Populated places in Southern District (Israel)
1946 establishments in Mandatory Palestine